Piotrowo  is a village in the administrative district of Gmina Lubomino, within Lidzbark County, Warmian-Masurian Voivodeship, in northern Poland.

Before 1772 the area was part of Kingdom of Poland. From 1772 to 1945, it was part of Prussia and then East Prussia in Germany.

References

Piotrowo